Rudolf Höllerl (12 December 1888 – 7 October 1952) was an Austrian footballer. He played in one match for the Austria national football team in 1909.

References

External links
 

1888 births
1952 deaths
Austrian footballers
Austria international footballers
Place of birth missing
Association footballers not categorized by position